The 2011–12 Texas–Arlington Mavericks men's basketball team represented the University of Texas at Arlington during the 2011–12 NCAA Division I men's basketball season. The Mavericks, led by sixth year head coach Scott Cross, played their home games at Texas Hall until the completion of the brand new College Park Center in February and are members of the West Division of the Southland Conference. The Mavericks were Southland West Division Champions and overall regular season champions but failed to win the Southland Basketball tournament after falling in the semifinals to McNeese State. As regular season champions, they received an automatic bid into the 2012 National Invitation Tournament where they lost in the first round to Washington.  The 24 wins was the most wins in program history.

This was the Mavericks' final year as a member of the Southland Conference, as they joined the Western Athletic Conference on July 1, 2012.

Roster

Media
All UT-Arlington games are broadcast by KVCE.

Schedule

|-
!colspan=9 style=|Regular season

|-
!colspan=9 style=| Southland Tournament

|-
!colspan=9 style=| NIT

References

UT Arlington Mavericks men's basketball seasons
Texas-Arlington
Texas-Arlington
Texas-Arlington Mavericks basketball
Texas-Arlington Mavericks basketball